Khangalassky District (Xaŋalas uluuha) is an administrative and municipal district (raion, or ulus), one of the thirty-four in the Sakha Republic, Russia. It is located in the center of the republic and borders Megino-Kangalassky District in the east, Amginsky and Aldansky Districts in the south, Olyokminsky District in the southwest, Gorny District in the northwest, and the territory of the city of republic significance of Yakutsk in the north. Its administrative center is the town of Pokrovsk. As of the 2010 Census, the total population of the district, excluding its administrative center, was 24,557.

Geography

The main river in the district is the Lena. The Lena Pillars National Park is located in the district along the right bank of the Lena River and the left bank of the Sinyaya River. The Turuuk Khaya Rocks, a protected area, are unusual rock formations by the Lyutenge River. The Tamma river forms the border between this district and Megino-Kangalassky District in a stretch of its course. Other important rivers are the Menda and the Kenkeme. 

History
The district was established on February 10, 1930 as Zapadno-Kangalassky District. From 1937 to 1992, it was known as Ordzhonikidzevsky District.

Administrative and municipal status
Within the framework of administrative divisions, Khangalassky District is one of the thirty-four in the republic. It is divided into one town (an administrative division with the administrative center in the town (inhabited locality) of Pokrovsk), one settlement (an administrative division with the administrative center in the urban-type settlement (inhabited locality) of Mokhsogollokh), and sixteen rural okrugs (naslegs), which comprise twenty-seven rural localities. As a municipal division, the district is incorporated as Khangalassky Municipal District. Within the municipal district, the Town of Pokrovsk is incorporated into Pokrovsk Urban Settlement, the Settlement of Mokhsogollokh is incorporated into Mokhsogollokh Urban Settlement, and the sixteen rural okrugs are incorporated into sixteen rural settlements. The town of Pokrovsk serves as the administrative center of both the administrative and municipal district.

Inhabited localities

Economy
The economy of the district is mostly based on agriculture and production of construction materials. The A360 Lena Highway runs through the district.

Demographics

As of the 2002 Census, the ethnic composition was as follows:
Yakuts: 59.5%
Russians: 33.4%
Ukrainians: 1.4%
Evenks: 1.1%
Evens: 0.7%
others: 4.0%

References

Notes

Sources
Official website of the Sakha Republic. Registry of the Administrative-Territorial Divisions of the Sakha Republic. Khangalassky District. 

Districts of the Sakha Republic